Oncidium varicosum is a species of orchid ranging from Brazil to northern Argentina.

References

External links 

varicosum
Orchids of Argentina
Orchids of Brazil